Matthew Michael Carnahan (sometimes credited as Matt Carnahan) is an American screenwriter who wrote the feature film The Kingdom (2007), and the film adaptation of the hit BBC television drama serial State of Play. Carnahan also wrote the screenplay for Lions for Lambs for United Artists. His brother is Joe Carnahan, who wrote and directed Narc (2002), Smokin' Aces (2006) and The A-Team (2010).

He worked on the screenplay for the zombie film World War Z (2013). He wrote the screenplay for the film adaptation of Nemesis with his brother Joe Carnahan.

Filmography
Film

Television

References

External links

Writers from Detroit
Year of birth missing (living people)
Living people
American male screenwriters
Film directors from Michigan
People from Port Huron, Michigan
Screenwriters from Michigan